Adrian Township may refer to the following places in the United States:

 Adrian Township, Kansas
 Adrian Township, Michigan
 Adrian Township, Minnesota
 Adrian Township, North Dakota
 Adrian Township, South Dakota

Township name disambiguation pages